Ryo Tokita''' is a Japanese born artist who emigrated to the United States in 1969, settling in the town of Pen Argyl, Pennsylvania, outside Nazareth.  

He has produced op art and color field pieces and a series of Japanese-influenced works. Recently the subject of a retrospective at Lafayette College's Williams Center in Easton, Pennsylvania, his work has also been introduced into the permanent collection of and is currently on view at the Allentown Art Museum.  

In the 1960s, he was one of  46 artists exhibited in the Museum of Modern Art's International Council's traveling exhibition named The New Japanese Painting and Sculpture. In 1985, he was one of nine regrouped for Modern Japanese Abstracts at the Firehouse Gallery of Nassau Community College in Garden City, Long Island.

External links
"Exhibition: Ryo Tokita: Sei (Life)" by Tokita at Lafayette College"Japanese Abstractions: Looking West", The New York Times, December 29, 1985

Japanese artists
Japanese emigrants to the United States
Living people
People from Northampton County, Pennsylvania
Year of birth missing (living people)